Donald Ernest Johns (December 13, 1937 – July 8, 2017) was a Canadian professional ice hockey defenceman who played 153 games in the National Hockey League (NHL) for the Montreal Canadiens, New York Rangers, and Minnesota North Stars. He played in the Canadian minor leagues for the Fort William Canadiens and the Winnepeg Warriors (1957 to 1960) before signing with the Rangers, where he teamed with Harry Howell, Bill Gadsby and Lou Fontinato. Johns was on the Minnesota North Stars roster during their inaugural season of 1967–1968. The Canadiens dropped him after a single game, when he left to attend his mother's funeral.

Personal
Johns and his wife Carol were married for 55 years, until his death, and they had a son, Michael and daughter, Kimberly.

References

External links

1937 births
2017 deaths
Baltimore Clippers players
Canadian ice hockey defencemen
Ice hockey people from Ontario
Montreal Canadiens players
Minnesota North Stars players
New York Rangers players
Sportspeople from the County of Brant
Winnipeg Warriors (minor pro) players